Madian is a town under the administration of Huimin County, Shandong, China. , it has five villages under its administration.

References 

Township-level divisions of Shandong
Huimin County